"Fast Car" is a song by English singer-songwriter Taio Cruz from his third studio album, TY.O (2011). The track, which was written exclusively for the American release, was released as the album's second single in the U.S. and does not feature on the European edition of the album. The track was written by Cruz, Max Martin, Klas Ahlund, Usher, Alexander Kronlund, Adam Jewelle Baptiste, and produced by Max Martin, Klas Åhlund. The music video was released on 5 November 2012.

Track listing

Credits and personnel
Lead vocals – Taio Cruz
Producers – Max Martin, Klas Ahlund
Lyrics – Cruz, Max Martin, Klas Ahlund, Usher Raymond IV, Alexander Kronlund, Adam Jewelle Baptiste
Label: Island Records

Chart performance

Release history

References

2012 singles
2012 songs
Taio Cruz songs
Songs written by Max Martin
Songs written by Usher (musician)
Songs written by Klas Åhlund
Songs written by Alexander Kronlund
Island Records singles
Songs written by Taio Cruz
Songs written by Adam Baptiste